HMS Carnarvon Bay was a  anti-aircraft frigate built for the Royal Navy during World War 2.

Design and description
The Bay-class frigates were anti-aircraft versions of the  anti-submarine frigates intended for service in the Far East. She was powered by two vertical triple-expansion steam engines, each driving one shaft, using steam provided by two Admiralty three-drum boilers. The ship's complement was 157 officers and ratings.

The ships were armed with four QF 4-inch Mark XVI dual-purpose guns in two twin mounts forward of the superstructure. Supplementing their anti-aircraft (AA) defence, they had two twin mounts for 40 mm Bofors and two twin mounts for Oerlikon 20 mm cannon AA guns. Some ships had their Oerlikons replaced by two single Bofors guns. She was fitted with a 24-barrel Hedgehog spigot mortar. Two depth charge rails and four throwers were fitted for 50–60 depth charges.

Construction and career
HMS Carnarvon Bay, named after Caernarfon Bay (anglicised as 'Carnarvon Bay') in Gwynedd, Wales, was originally ordered as the  vessel Loch Maddy, but the order was changed in 1944. Built by Henry Robb of Leith, the ship was laid down on 8 June 1944 and launched on 15 March 1945 by Lady Westwood.

Service history
After sea trials Carnarvon Bay was assigned to the Rosyth Flotilla, joining in November 1945. Deployed for training duties, she made a single voyage to Oslo in January 1946, and to Scapa Flow in February. In April she sailed to Harwich to be decommissioned. Laid-up in the Reserve Fleet at Harwich, she was used as an accommodation ship for personnel of the Reserve Fleet.

Carnarvon Bay remained at Harwich until the Reserve Fleet was closed down and was then transferred to Chatham. Placed on the Disposal List in 1959 the ship was sold to an Italian ship-breaker and towed to La Spezia where she arrived on 28 August 1959.

References

Bibliography
 
 
 
 

 

1945 ships
Bay-class frigates